The Cotton Industry (Reorganisation) Act 1939 was an Act of Parliament in the United Kingdom. It established the Cotton Board and was responsible for streamlining the industry by closing "surplus" factories.

See also
 Cotton Industry (Reorganisation) Act 1936
 Cotton Industry Act 1959

References

Cotton industry in England
1930s economic history
History of the textile industry in the United Kingdom
United Kingdom Acts of Parliament 1939